Modibo Niakaté (born 26 March 1981) is a French-Malian basketball player. He played for the Mali national basketball team. Niakaté played college basketball for Cleveland State, before playing professionally in France, Czech Republic and Germany.

Niakaté was the top scorer of AfroBasket 2007, where he averaged 21.8 points per game.

References

1981 births
Living people
Basketball Löwen Braunschweig players
BC Orchies players
Chorale Roanne Basket players
Cleveland State Vikings men's basketball players
Élan Chalon players
French expatriate basketball people in the United States
French men's basketball players
French people of Malian descent
Limoges CSP players
Sportspeople from Créteil
Point guards